This List of hospitals in Luxembourg shows the notable hospitals and clinics in Luxembourg.

Centre Hospitalier de Luxembourg (CHL)
 Municipal Hospital (Luxembourg), established in 1976
CHL Pediatric Clinic
CHL Maternity Grande-Duchesse Charlotte, established in 1936
CHL Clinic d'Eich
Robert Schuman Hospitals, formed in 2014
Hospital Kirchberg
Clinique Bohler
Zitha Clinic
Clinic Sainte-Marie
Centre Hospitalier du Nord
Clinique Regionale du Nord 
Centre Hospitalier Emile Mayrisch  
Centre Hospitalier Emile Mayrisch, Hôpital Princesse Marie-Astrid, established in 1981
Centre Hospitalier Emile Mayrisch, Hôpital de la Ville de Dudelange, first established in 1884
Centre Hospitalier Emile Mayrisch, Centre Médical Clinique Sainte Marie
Hospital Intercommunal
Centre Hospitalier Neuro-Psychiatrique
Centre Thérapeutique Useldange
Centre Thérapeutique Manternach
Centre Thérapeutique Diekirch 
Rehazenter (National Rehabilitation Centre)

See also
 Healthcare in Luxembourg
 History of hospitals

References

 List of hospitals in Luxembourg
Luxembourg
Hospitals
Luxembourg